The 2018 AFL draft consisted of the various periods where the 18 clubs in the Australian Football League (AFL) traded and recruited players following the completion of the 2018 AFL season.

For the first time, the AFL draft featured live trading of picks and was held over two days, with the first round held on the evening of Thursday, 22 November and the remainder of the draft being held on Friday, 23 November  The draft was held in Victoria for the first time since 2009.

Key dates

Player movements

Previous trades 
Since 2015, clubs have been able to trade future picks in the next year's national draft during the trade period. As a result, a total of 29 selections for the 2018 draft were traded during the 2017 trade period, and the selection order for each of these picks is tied to the original club's finishing position in the 2018 season.

Free agency

  received an end of second round compensation pick for Reece Conca, however this pick was withdrawn due to Tom Lynch signing with them

Trades

Retirements and delistings

Pre-draft selections

Prior to the draft, the two bottom teams  and  applied for Priority Picks in the National Draft, which the AFL denied. However,  were granted pre-draft access to up to three and  up to two mature-aged State League players each, these selections could be traded to other clubs.

2018 national draft 

Indicative draft order as of 21 November 2018

Rookie elevations 
Clubs were able to promote any player who was listed on their rookie list in 2018 to their 2019 primary playing list prior to the draft.

2019 rookie draft

Category B rookie selections 
Clubs were able to nominate category B rookies to join their club in 2019.

Pre-season supplemental selection period
Shortly before the National draft, the AFL introduced a new mechanism to allow clubs to sign certain eligible players direct to their Rookie List, rather than through the draft, provided the club had vacancies on their rookie list. Eligible players could be listed between December and March.

See also 

 2018 AFL Women's draft

References 

Australian Football League draft
Draft
AFL Draft
2010s in Melbourne
Australian rules football in Victoria (Australia)
Sport in Melbourne
Events in Melbourne